Bronckhorst is a municipality in Gelderland, the Netherlands. The municipality is the result of a merger of the former municipalities Hengelo, Hummelo en Keppel, Steenderen, Vorden and Zelhem, on 1 January 2005. The municipality is named after the medieval castle of the Bronckhorst family, who once ruled this area.

The seat of the municipality is Hengelo.

Population centres 

Formerly in Hengelo:
 Hengelo
 Keijenborg
 Noordink
 Dunsborg
 Bekveld en Gooi
 Varssel
 Veldhoek

Formerly in Hummelo en Keppel:
 Achter-Drempt
 Eldrik
 Hoog-Keppel
 Hummelo
 Laag-Keppel
 Voor-Drempt

Formerly in Vorden:
 Delden
 Kranenburg
 Linde
 Medler
 Mossel
 Veldwijk
 Vierakker
 Vorden
 Wichmond
 Wildenborch

Formerly in Zelhem:
 De Meene
 Halle
 Halle-Heide
 Halle-Nijman
 Heidenhoek
 Heurne
 Oosterwijk
 Velswijk
 Wassinkbrink
 Winkelshoek
 Wittebrink
 Zelhem

Formerly in Steenderen:
 Baak
 Bronkhorst
 Olburgen
 Rha
 Steenderen
 Toldijk

Keppel 
Keppel received city rights in 1404.

Gallery

Notable people 

 Henrica Iliohan (1850 in Vorden – 1921) a Dutch-born American woman suffragist
 Henk Zeevalking (1922 in Laag-Keppel – 2005) a Dutch politician and co-founder of the Democrats 66 (D66)
 Prof Jan Remmelink (1922 in Zelhem - 2003) was Attorney General of the High Council of the Netherlands 1968/1989
 Annemarie Jorritsma (born 1950 in Hengelo) a Dutch politician

Sport 
 Leo Klein Gebbink (born 1968 in Zelhem) a former field hockey midfield player
 Klaas-Jan Huntelaar (born 1983 in Voor-Drempt) a Dutch professional footballer with over 450 club caps

References

External links 

 

 
Achterhoek
Municipalities of Gelderland
Municipalities of the Netherlands established in 2005